= Sentinus deus =

Sentinus deus is a Roman Mythology God who gives thought to an infant in his mother's womb, according to the Fable.
